Evenings for Sale is a 1932 American pre-Code comedy film directed by Stuart Walker and written by S.K. Lauren, Agnes Brand Leahy and I. A. R. Wylie. The film stars Herbert Marshall, Sari Maritza, Charlie Ruggles, Mary Boland, George Barbier and Bert Roach. The film was released on November 12, 1932, by Paramount Pictures.

Plot
Impoverished Count von Degenthal (Marshall) plans to commit suicide and spends his last night at a costume ball. There he meets lovely Lela Fischer (Maritza) and falls in love with her. A chance meeting with his former butler brings a job offer as a gigolo in a dance club. He dances with Jenny Kent (Boland), a wealthy American heiress, and she becomes so enamoured with him that she buys his castle, clearing all his debts. The count gives her his family's treasured ring in gratitude for her great sincerity. Lela decides to visit him, but overhears Bimpfl deceiving her into believing that this was the count's way of expressing his understanding of their engagement to be married. He does so merely to try and secure a serving position in their household. Naturally, Lela believes it too. Kent receives news from America that she has become a grandmother, and it dawns on her that she has been foolish in pursuing a much younger man. She returns to America, after telling Bimpfl of her plans to turn the mansion into an hôtel. Lela's misunderstanding is cleared up, and she and the count reconcile.

Cast
Herbert Marshall as Count Franz von Degenthal
Sari Maritza as Lela Fischer
Charlie Ruggles as Bimpfl
Mary Boland as Jenny Kent
George Barbier as Henrich Fischer
Bert Roach as Otto Volk
Lucien Littlefield as Schwenk
Clay Clement as Von Trask
Arnold Korff as Ritter

References

External links 
 

1932 films
1932 comedy films
American comedy films
Films directed by Stuart Walker
Paramount Pictures films
Films set in Vienna
American black-and-white films
1930s English-language films
1930s American films
Films about gigolos
Films about nobility